Sir John Parker (1548– 15 October 1617) was an English soldier and politician.

He was the son of Thomas Parker (died 1580) of Ratton, Willingdon, Sussex. He spent time on military service in Ireland before being posted to the Berwick garrison.

He was a Member of Parliament for Hastings in 1589; Truro, Cornwall in 1593; Dunheved in 1601; and East Looe in 1604.

He was a gentleman pensioner by 1587–1603, constable of Leominster castle in 1589, bailiff of Longney manor, Yorkshire in 1589, keeper of Falmouth Castle from 1603 to his death and captain of Pendennis Castle from 1603 to his death. He was knighted in 1603.

He died unmarried.

References

1548 births
1617 deaths
English MPs 1589
English MPs 1593
English MPs 1601
English MPs 1604–1611
Members of the Parliament of England for Truro
Members of the Parliament of England for Launceston
Members of the Parliament of England (pre-1707) for East Looe